Ivaylo Viktorov Andonov (born 14 August 1967) is a Bulgarian former professional footballer who played as a forward.

Football career
After beginning professionally with hometown's PFC Pirin Blagoevgrad, Andonov made a name for himself at PFC CSKA Sofia, constantly being one of the first division topscorers, while also being instrumental in the club's 1992 league conquest.

Between 1994 and 1996, he had two unassuming spells abroad, in Spain and Germany (the latter being in the 2. Bundesliga. Returning subsequently to CSKA, Andonov netted 18 times in only 25 matches, for another championship conquest. He retired in 2000 at the age of 33, after two seasons with neighbours PFC Lokomotiv Sofia and another spell in Germany, with lowly 1. FC Union Berlin.

Andonov gained five caps for Bulgaria and was picked for the squad at the 1994 FIFA World Cup, but did not leave the bench during the tournament in the United States as the national team finished in fourth position.

In 2001, he established his own children's academy near the village Pokrovnik.

Honours
CSKA Sofia
Bulgarian League: 1991–92, 1996–97
Bulgarian Cup: 1992–93, 1996–97

References

External links
 
 
 

1967 births
Living people
Bulgarian footballers
Bulgaria international footballers
1994 FIFA World Cup players
Association football forwards
First Professional Football League (Bulgaria) players
Second Professional Football League (Bulgaria) players
OFC Pirin Blagoevgrad players
PFC CSKA Sofia players
FC Lokomotiv 1929 Sofia players
La Liga players
Albacete Balompié players
2. Bundesliga players
Arminia Bielefeld players
1. FC Union Berlin players
Bulgarian expatriate footballers
Bulgarian expatriate sportspeople in Germany
Expatriate footballers in Germany
Bulgarian expatriate sportspeople in Spain
Expatriate footballers in Spain
Macedonian Bulgarians
Sportspeople from Blagoevgrad